South Hunterdon Regional School District is a regional public school district serving students in pre-kindergarten though twelfth grades from three communities in southern Hunterdon County, New Jersey, United States. The district was established for the 2014–15 school year by consolidating the K-6 districts for Lambertville, Stockton and West Amwell Township together with South Hunterdon Regional High School to create a K-12 district.

As of the 2018–19 school year, the district, comprising three schools, had an enrollment of 925 students and 108.0 classroom teachers (on an FTE basis), for a student–teacher ratio of 8.6:1.

History
In a special election held in September 2013, voters from Lambertville, Stockton and West Amwell Township passed referendums to dissolve the South Hunterdon Regional High School District and to combine the three existing school districts from each municipality (Lambertville City School District, Stockton Borough School District and West Amwell Township School District), with majorities in each community passing both ballot items. A single combined regional district was created, serving students in PreK-12, with property taxes levied under a formula in which 57% is based on property values and 43% on the number of students. The executive county superintendent appointed an interim board of education for the new regional district, which was responsible for implementing the merger.

A study commissioned by the district prepared by McKissick Associates looked at options for using, modifying and expanding school facilities in the district, in light of long-term trends indicating a decline in the number of school-aged children in the three municipalities. In a February 2016, a presentation prepared for the Board of Education outlined various scenarios, which could involve options ranging from retaining all existing facilities to consolidating all schools at a single site. After reviewing a matrix of all 10 options and weighing each on several factors identified as relevant, committee members ranked the choices; based on committee votes, the three preferred choices were (1) to keep K-5 students in Lambertville and West Amwell, while moving 6th grade to the high school complex, (2) keeping all facilities at their present locations with equity additions as needed and (3) a consolidated K-12 at a single site.

Stockton Borough Elementary School, which had seen a dramatic decline in enrollment, was closed at the end of the 2017–18 school year.

A November 2021 referendum allocating $33 million for construction projects passed by a two-vote margin. Voters in Lambertville and Stockton voted strongly in favor of the project, overcoming strong opposition from West Amwell Township voters. Renovations and expansion to Lambertville Public School will run $12.7 million and a new middle school for grades 5-8 will be constructed on the high school campus at a cost of $20.7 million.

Schools
Schools in the district (with 2018–19 enrollment data from the National Center for Education Statistics) are:
Elementary schools
Lambertville Public School with 225 students in grades PreK-6
West Amwell School with 224 students in grades K-6
High school
South Hunterdon Regional High School with 458 students in grades 7-12

Administration
Core members of the district's administration are:
Dr. Louis Muenker, Superintendent
Kerry Sevilis, Business Administrator / Board Secretary

Board of education
The district's board of education, with nine members, sets policy and oversees the fiscal and educational operation of the district through its administration. As a Type II school district, the board's trustees are elected directly by voters to serve three-year terms of office on a staggered basis, with three seats up for election each year held (since 2014) as part of the November general election. The board appoints a superintendent to oversee the day-to-day operation of the district.

References

External links 
South Hunterdon Regional School District

 School Data for the South Hunterdon Regional School District, National Center for Education Statistics

Lambertville, New Jersey
Stockton, New Jersey
West Amwell Township, New Jersey
2014 establishments in New Jersey
School districts established in 2014
School districts in Hunterdon County, New Jersey